Subedar Khudadad Khan, VC (20 October 1888 – 8 March 1971) was a Pakistani and the recipient of the Victoria Cross (VC), the highest military award for gallantry in the face of the enemy given to British and Commonwealth forces. During the First World War, on 31 October 1914 at Hollebeke, Belgium, 26-year-old Khan, serving in the British Indian Army, performed an act of bravery for which he was awarded the Victoria Cross.

He was the first British Indian subject to earn the Victoria Cross, after members of the British Indian Army became eligible for the Victoria Cross in 1911, replacing the Indian Order of Merit first class.

Life
Born on 20 October 1888 in the village of Dab in Chakwal District of the Punjab Province, British India (now Pakistan) in a Punjabi Muslim Rajput family of Minhas Clan, Khudadad Khan was a Sepoy in the 129th Duke of Connaught's Own Baluchis, British Indian Army (now 11th Battalion The Baloch Regiment of Pakistan Army). The battalion formed part of the Indian Corps, which was sent to France in 1914 to reinforce the British forces fighting on the Western Front during the First World War.

In October 1914, when the Germans launched the First Battle of Ypres, the newly arrived 129th Baluchis were rushed to the frontline to support the hard-pressed British troops. On 31 October, two companies of the Baluchis bore the brunt of the main German attack near the village of Gheluvelt in Hollebeke Sector. The out-numbered Baluchis fought gallantly but were overwhelmed after suffering heavy casualties. Sepoy Khudadad Khan's machine-gun team, along with one other, kept their guns in action throughout the day, preventing the Germans from making the final breakthrough. The other gun was disabled by a shell and eventually, Khudadad Khan's own team was overrun. All the men were killed by bullets or bayonets except Khudadad Khan who, despite being badly wounded, had continued working his gun. He was left for dead by the enemy but managed to crawl back to his regiment during the night. Thanks to his bravery, and that of his fellow Baluchis, the Germans were held up just long enough for Indian and British reinforcements to arrive. They strengthened the line, and prevented the German Army from reaching the vital ports; Khan was awarded the Victoria Cross.

Official citation 

He was supposed to be awarded the medal on the same day, 5 December 1914, as Darwan Singh Negi VC but Khan was too sick. King George handed over the medal on 26 January 1915. As such Khan is regarded as the first Indian recipient, as Negi's VC action was on a later date.

Later life and legacy 
After the battle, he was taken to the Royal Pavilion in Brighton to be treated for injuries suffered during the battle. Khan retired as a Subedar in 1929, after which he settled in the Punjab. He made several visits to Britain in connection with the Victoria Cross, including the Victoria Cross centenary review parade in Hyde Park, London, in June 1956. He died on 8 March 1971 aged 82, and is buried in Chak No. 25, Mandi Bahauddin. His Victoria Cross is on display at his ancestral house in Village Dab (Chakwal), Pakistan.

A statue of Khudadad Khan is at the entrance of the Pakistan Army Museum in Rawalpindi.

In 2016 a play by Ishy Din, Wipers, about Khudadad Khan's feat was put on in a number of English theatres.

Footnotes

References
Citations

Bibliography
 
 
 
 
 - Total pages: 362

External links
 

Indian World War I recipients of the Victoria Cross
British Indian Army officers
1888 births
1971 deaths
People from Chakwal District
Indian Army personnel of World War I